List of hospitals in Belize include the follow:

 Belize Medical Associates, Belize City
 Belmopan Hospital, Cayo
 Corozal Community Hospital, Corozal
 Dangriga Hospital
 Karl Heusner Memorial Hospital, Belize City
 La Loma Luz Hospital, Santa Elena
 Northern Regional Hospital, Orange Walk
 Punta Gorda Hospital, Toledo
 San Ignacio Community Hospital, Cayo
 Southern Regional Hospital, Stann Creek
 Western Regional Hospital, Belmopan

References

List
Hospitals
Belize
Belize